called Gakuendai (学園大) or Shōdai (商大), is a private Japanese  university in Kumamoto, Japan. It was established in 1942, at which time Eastern Language Vocational College (東洋語学専門学校 Tōyō Gengo Senmon Gakkō) was subsumed into it. It was renamed Kumamoto Language Vocational College (熊本言語専門学校 Kumamoto Gengo Senmon Gakkō) in 1945, and was made into  Kumamoto Commerce University (熊本商科大学 Kumamoto shōka daigaku) in 1954. It acquired its current name, Kumamoto Gakuen University, in 1994. At present, the university has 4 faculties with 11 departments.

The university also has an affiliated senior high school, located immediately adjacent to the campus. While the high school is recognized as one of the best in the prefecture, the reputation of the university itself is as a second-rank institution.

Faculties and graduate schools

Faculties 
the Faculty of Commercial Science(in English)
Commercial Science (main)
Business
Hospitality Management
Commercial Science (minor)
the Faculty of Economics(in English)
Economics
International Economics
Legal Economics
the Faculty of Foreign Languages(in English)
English
East Asian Studies
the Faculty of Social Welfare(in English)
Social Welfare (main)
Social Work and Environmental Design
Child welfare environmental subject
Social Welfare (minor)

Graduate schools 
Commercial Science(in Japanese)
Commercial Science
Business Management(in Japanese)
Business Management
Economics(in Japanese)
Economics
International Culture(in Japanese)
majoring International Culture
Social Welfare(in Japanese)
Social Welfare
Social Work and Environmental Design

Points of interest
The Open Research Center for Minamata Studies: this center carries out research into Minamata disease. Masazumi Harada is the head of this center.

Partner institutions 

Partner Institutions
KGU has signed agreements with 18 different partner institutions in the 9 countries listed below.

United States

Montana State University home page is here
The University of Montana 
Carroll College (Montana) 
University of the Incarnate Word 
University of Wisconsin–Eau Claire

United Kingdom

Liverpool John Moores University 
University of Central Lancashire

New Zealand

Unitec New Zealand

Australia

La Trobe University

Canada

Saint Mary's University 
Carleton University

Republic of Korea

Daejeon University

People's Republic of China

Shenzhen University 
Renmin University of China (Beijing) 
Beijing International Studies University 
Guangxi Normal University (Guilin)
Beijing Language and Culture University

Kingdom of Thailand

Chulalongkorn University

Socialist Republic of Viet Nam

Vietnam National University Hanoi

References

External links

Kumamoto Gakuen University website (in Japanese)
Kumamoto Gakuen University Library (in Japanese)
Office of International Programs (in Japanese)
Kumamoto Gakuen University Graduate School (in Japanese)
The Open Research Center for Minamata Studies
Kumamoto Gakuen Univ. Fuzoku High School (in Japanese)

Famous alumni

Yoku Hata    Japanese comedian 
Eiji Ezaki     Japanese pro wrestler 
Mr. Gannosuke Japanese pro wrestler from Nagasaki, member of IWA.
Hoseki Miyata Former president of the Miyazaki Taiyo bank 
Midori Asai  Kumamoto TV announcer. 
Akihiro Tanaka  Economist and president of Ushio Inc.
Yasuo Matsuoka  Economist and former president LAWSON. INC.

Buildings and structures in Kumamoto
Private universities and colleges in Japan
Educational institutions established in 1942
Universities and colleges in Kumamoto Prefecture
1942 establishments in Japan